Lampson Field  is a public airport located three miles (4.8 km) south of the town of Lakeport, in Lake County, California, United States.

Features of the airport include 4.0 degree precision approach path indicator (PAPI) lights on runway 28, pilot controlled lighting, and an automated weather observing system (AWOS).

See also

List of airports in California

References 
Airport Master Record (FAA Form 5010), also available as a printable form (PDF)
County of Lake - Public Works - Airport

External links

Lake County Airmen's Association

Airports in California
Buildings and structures in Lake County, California
Transportation in Lake County, California